This is a list of people from the University of Oxford involved in education.  Many were students at one (or more) of the colleges of the University, and others held fellowships at a college. Some are known for their involvement in schools, including Thomas Arnold, Headmaster of Rugby School and Anthony Chenevix-Trench, Headmaster of Eton College.  Others for their work with universities or educational administration, such as Lord Butterworth, the founding Vice-Chancellor of University of Warwick.  University professors and lecturers who are primarily known for their work in their specialist field are found in other lists.  This list forms part of a series of lists of people associated with the University of Oxford – for other lists, please see the main article List of University of Oxford people.

List
Hugh Catchpole (OBE, CBE) Founder Principal Cadet College Hasan Abdal, Principal Rashtriya Indian Military College, Pakistan Air Force Public School Sargodha
Tristram Jones-Parry (Christ Church) Headmaster of Westminster School 1998–2005
Alan Aldous (Jesus) Headmaster King's School, Pontefract 1959–70, Leeds Grammar School 1970–75
Eric Anderson (Lincoln) Headmaster Abingdon 1970–75, Shrewsbury 1975–80, Eton 1980–94; Rector Lincoln College, Oxford 1994–2000

Thomas Arnold (Corpus Christi and Oriel) Headmaster Rugby School 1828–41
Frank Aydelotte (Brasenose) President Swarthmore College 1921–40
Trevor Bench-Capon (St John's) Professor of Computer Science, University of Liverpool
Caroline Benn (formerly Viscountess Stansgate) co–founder Campaign for Comprehensive Educn, Pres Socialist Educn Assocn
Michael T. Benson (St. Antony's) President of Coastal Carolina University
Arthur Boissier Headmaster of Harrow 1939–42, Dir of Public Relations Ministry of Fuel & Power 1943–45
Edward Henry Bradby (Balliol) Principal Hatfield College, Durham 1852, House Master Harrow 1853–68, Headmaster Haileybury 1868–83
Joseph Lloyd Brereton (University) founder of schools and of Cavendish College, Cambridge
Henry Bright (Brasenose and Balliol) Headmaster King's School, Worcester 1589–1627
Henry Bright (Trinity and New College) Headmaster Abingdon 1758–74, New College School, Oxford 1774–94
Scott Buchanan (Balliol) founder Great Books program St John's College, Annapolis
Richard Busby (Christ Church) Headmaster of Westminster School 1638–95
William Herbert Cam (New College) Headmaster Dudley Grammar School 1897–83, Abingdon 1883–93 
Jack Butterworth, Baron Butterworth (New College) founding Vice-Chancellor Warwick University
Leo Chamberlain (University and St Benet's Hall) Headmaster Ampleforth 1992–2003, Master St Benet's 2004–
Anthony Chenevix-Trench (Christ Church) Headmaster Bradfield 1955–64, Eton 1964–70, Fettes 1970
William Macbride Childs (Keble) First vice-chancellor of the University of Reading
Nathaniel L. Clapton (Hertford) Headmaster Boteler Grammar School, Warrington 1940–50, King Edward VII School, Sheffield 1950-65
Cristóbal Coboresearcher in new and educational technologies

John Colet (Magdalen) Dean of St Paul's Cathedral, founder of St Paul's School, Chaplain to Henry VIII
Terence Copley (Harris Manchester)
Clive Dytor (Wycliffe Hall) Headmaster, Oratory School, Woodcote, Oxfordshire
Owen Morgan Edwards (Balliol and Lincoln) Chief Inspector of Schools for Wales 1907, MP 1899–1900
Thomas Farnaby (Merton) grammarian, former half of the 17th century
Alan Gilbert (Nuffield) Vice-Chancellor University of Tasmania 1991–96, Melbourne 1996–2004, Manchester 2004-
Erskine William Gladstone (Christ Church) Headmaster Lancing College 1961–69, Chief Scout UK and Overseas Territories 1972–82
William Mitchell Grundy (Worcester) Headmaster Abingdon School 1913–47
Paul Giles
Ronald Gurner (St John's) Hdmaster Strand School 1920–26, King Edward VII, Sheffield 1926–27, Whitgift 1927–39
William Ross Hardie (Balliol) Professor of Humanity, University of Edinburgh, 1895–1916 
Michael Hoban (University) Headmaster St Edmund's School, Canterbury 1960–64, Bradfield 1964–71, Harrow 1971–81
John Hood (Worcester and All Souls) Vice-Chancellor University of Auckland 1999–2004, Oxford 2004–
Christopher Jamison Headmaster Worth School 1993–2001, President, International Commission on Benedictine Education;
Jonathan Kozol (Magdalen) expert on public education in the United States
Alexander Leeper (St John's) Warden of Trinity College, University of Melbourne 1876–1918
Sandy Lindsay (University and Balliol) Master of Balliol 1924–49, founder University College of North Staffordshire 1949
Thayne McCulloh (Wolfson) President Gonzaga University, Spokane, Washington USA
Stephen John McWatters (Trinity) Headmaster Clifton College 1963–75
Harold Marks (University) HM Inspectorate of Education 1951–79
Richard Mulcaster first Headmaster Merchant Taylors' School 1561–96, High Master St Paul's 1596
H. J. R. Murray (Balliol) Hdmaster Ormskirk Grammar Sch 1896, school inspector 1901, Board of Education 1928, historian of chess
Norah Lillian Penston (St Anne's) principal of Bedford College, University of London, from 1951–64 
Alec Peterson (Balliol) Director General of the International Baccalaureate Organisation 1968–77
James Elphinstone Roe (Worcester) clergyman, convict, and educator in Western Australia
Anthony Seldon (Worcester) Dep Hdmaster St Dunstan's Coll 1993–97, Hdmaster Brighton 1997–2005, Master Wellington 2005–
Fred Shirley (St Edmund Hall) Headmaster Worksop College 1921–35, King's School, Canterbury 1935–62
 Leon Simon, President of the Hebrew University of Jerusalem
Cecil Staton (Regent's Park College) Chancellor East Carolina University
Alan Stewart founding vice-chancellor of Massey University, New Zealand
William Alder Strange (Pembroke) Boden Sanskrit Scholar 1833, 2nd Master Lpool Royal Instn 1833–40, Hdmaster Abingdon 1840–68
Michael Swan Founder of Swan School of English, freelance writer, famed grammarian
Geoffrey Thomas (Kellogg and Linacre) Deputy Director Oxford University Department of External Studies 1978–86, Director Department for Continuing Education 1986–
Winifred Todhunter founder Todhunter School, New York
Ralph Townsend (Keble and Lincoln) Headmaster Sydney Grammar School 1989-99, Oundle School 1999-2005, Winchester College 2005-2016; Special Adviser to the President of Keio University and President Keio Academy of New York 2017-2021 
Jane Traies (St Anne's) educational consultant, former head teacher, lesbian-historical novelist
Barry Trapnell (Worcester) Headmaster Denstone and Oundle Schools, Chairman Cambridge Occupational Analysts 1986–2005
Tsuda Umeko (St Hilda's) founder of Joshi Eigaku–juku (now Tsudajuku University), Japan
Richard Valpy (Pembroke) Headmaster Reading Grammar School 1781–1831
Stacy Waddy (Balliol) Hdmaster King's Sch, Parramatta 1907–16, Canon St George's Cathl, Jerusalem 1918–24, Sec SPG 1924–37
Olive Willis (Somerville) founder of Downe House School 
Nathaniel Woodard founder of eleven schools
Aly Kassam-Remtulla academic, writer and anthropologist

References
Who Was Who – subscription access (January 2007) A&C Black (Publishers) Ltd. Cited in references as: Who Was Who.

Notes 

 Education
Oxford